The Repentant Magdalene , also called The Conversion of Mary Magdalene, is an oil painting of the early 1660s by the Baroque Italian painter Guido Cagnacci. It shows Mary Magdalene, beside her remonstrating sister Martha, at the moment she repents, echoed by an allegorical pairing of Virtue, an angel, chasing out Vice, a devil.  The painting forms part of the collection of the Norton Simon Museum.

Provenance 

The painting's owners have been:

 Dukes of Mantua by 1665, Duke Carlo II, villa Marmirolo and villa Favorita
 Duke Ferdinand Carlo Gonzaga, 10th and last Duke of Mantua in 1706, transported to Venice 1707; upon his death, transported 5 July 1708 to Padua, (sale, Venice, 1711)
 purchased by Christian Cole, and transported to England in April, 1711
 Henry Bentinck (1st Duke of Portland by 1716), Bulstrode House; Harcourt House by 1854
 Dukes of Portland, Welbeck Abbey and London
 by descent to Lady Anne Bentinck, Welbeck Abbey (sold at Christie's, London, 11 December 1981, lot 52)
 P.D. Colnaghi & Co., London
 Norton Simon Art Foundation

See also

 Penitent Magdalene (Caravaggio)
 Penitent Magdalene (Titian, 1565)

References

External links
 "The Repentant Magdalene". Norton Simon Museum. Retrieved 21 August 2022.

Paintings depicting Mary Magdalene
1660s paintings
Paintings in the collection of the Norton Simon Museum
Angels in art
Baroque paintings
Paintings by Guido Cagnacci